Events from the year 1948 in Pakistan.

Incumbents

Federal government
Governor-General: Muhammad Ali Jinnah (until 11 September), Khawaja Nazimuddin (starting 11 September)
Prime Minister: Liaquat Ali Khan

Governors
 Governor of Northwest Frontier: George Cunningham (until 19 April); Ambrose Dundas Flux Dundas (starting 19 April)
 Governor of West Punjab: Francis Mudie 
 Governor of Sindh: Shaikh G.H. Hidayatullah (until 7 October); Shaikh Din Muhammad (starting 7 October)

Events
 Widespread violence and massacres of Muslims, Hindus and Sikhs
 Nearly 10 million people migrate to Pakistan and India. Muslims immigrate to Pakistan while Hindus and Sikhs immigrate to India.

February
 24, Referendum approves Junagadh's accession to India.
 25, Junagadh's Accession to India in effect.

May
 1, Pakistan and India went to war over Kashmir region. The Pakistani-captured one-third was known as Azad Jammu and Kashmir, while India occupied the eastern two-thirds now called Jammu and Kashmir

July
 30, Fatima Jinnah is aware of her birthday, and is observed for the first time, since independence; the nation refers her to the titles of "Mother of the Nation" and Khatoon-I-Pakistan.

See also
 1947 in Pakistan
 Other events of 1948
 1949 in Pakistan
 List of Pakistani films before 1950
 Timeline of Pakistani history

 
1940s in Pakistan
Years of the 20th century in Pakistan
1948 in Asia